Punilla Province is one of the three provinces of the Ñuble Region of Chile

Communes 
San Carlos
San Nicolás
San Fabián
Coihueco
Ñiquén

References 

 
Provinces of Chile
Provinces of Ñuble Region
Punilla
2018 establishments in Chile
2018 in Chilean law